Trog is a 1970 British science fiction horror film directed by Freddie Francis, and starring Joan Crawford in a story about the discovery of a troglodyte (or Ice Age "caveman") in twentieth-century United Kingdom. The screenplay was written by Peter Bryan, John Gilling, and Aben Kandel. Trog marks Crawford's last movie appearance.

Plot
Set in contemporary Britain, the film follows Dr. Brockton (Joan Crawford), a renowned anthropologist who learns that in the caves of the countryside a lone male troglodyte is alive and might be able to be helped and even domesticated. In the interest of science and the potential groundbreaking discovery of the missing link, she gets the creature to the surface; and while the rest of the townsfolk and police scatter in terror, Brockton stands steady with her tranquilizer gun and stuns the caveman into submission. She brings him back to her lab for study, but runs into trouble as a few people oppose the presence of a "monster" in the town, especially Sam Murdock (Michael Gough), a local businessman who is not only afraid of the negative commercial consequences but is also suspicious of a woman heading a research facility. In the meantime, the creature, given the name of "Trog", is taught by Brockton to play and share; and the capacity for language is induced by a number of surgeries and a mysterious hypnotic device that causes Trog to see or relive his distant past, including clashes between various animals.

Still disturbed by Brockton's experiments, and enraged at a municipal court's decision to protect Trog, Murdock releases Trog in the middle of the night, hoping the caveman will be confronted and killed by either local residents or well-armed authorities. His plan ultimately succeeds. After being released, Trog wanders into town and kills the first three people he meets (a grocer, a butcher, and a citizen in a car), but not before he beats Murdock to death. Trog then snatches a little girl from a playground and takes her to his cave. Dr. Brockton, the police, and army personnel soon gather at the cave's entrance. After pleading fruitlessly with the authorities to let her reason with Trog and safely retrieve the girl, Brockton suddenly acts on her own and charges down into the cave, where she finds the girl cowering in a corner. Trog initially behaves aggressively at the sight of the doctor in his refuge, but after a stern reprimand and a plea by Brockton, Trog surrenders the girl to her. Shortly after the doctor and girl exit the cave, all of Brockton's work on behalf of science is shattered when soldiers ignite explosives before assaulting the cave. Trog is quickly wounded in a barrage of gunfire, falls, and is impaled on a stalagmite. The film then ends with an on-site news reporter asking the doctor to comment on the death of the missing link, but Brockton is either unwilling or unable at that moment to express her profound disappointment and grief over the loss of Trog, so she simply pushes aside the reporter's microphone and slowly walks away from the scene by herself.

Cast
 Joan Crawford as Dr. Brockton
 Michael Gough as Sam Murdock
 Bernard Kay as Inspector Greenham
 Kim Braden as Anne Brockton
 David Griffin as Malcolm Travers
 John Hamill as Cliff
 Thorley Walters as Magistrate
 Jack May as Dr. Selbourne
 Geoffrey Case as Bill
 Simon Lack as Lt. Colonel Vickers
 Chloe Franks as Little Girl
 Joe Cornelius as Trog
 Rachel Stephens as Child in the Park
 Maurice Good as television reporter

Production
Based on an original story by Peter Biyan and John Gilling, the film was initially developed by Tony Tenser at Tigon Films, which sold the project to producer Herman Cohen. In July 1968, Cohen announced he had signed a contract with Warner Bros-Seven Arts to produce Crooks and Coronets and Trog, with the latter to begin filming in September.

Filming was delayed for several months, until after Joan Crawford agreed to star in the production in May 1969. Trog was the second of two films that she starred in for Cohen, the first being Berserk! in 1967. It also paired her again with Michael Gough, who costarred with Crawford in that earlier film. Crawford's character in the original script had been a man but Cohen rewrote it specifically for Crawford.

The director Freddie Francis later commented on the benefits and challenges that he experienced working on the film:

Filming
Crawford described Trog as "a low budget picture", adding "I supply most of my own wardrobe." Just weeks after she committed to performing in the project, the film began shooting on 30 June 1969. The production also features actor David Warbeck, who has a small role as Alan Davis.

In a 1992 interview with the horror-film fan magazine Fangoria, Cohen notes that Trog, which was shot at Bray Studios and on location on the English moors, was more expensive to produce than Berserk! Cohen in that same interview also recalls the problems he had with Crawford's increased use of alcohol during filming:
 
The stop-motion dinosaur sequence in the film is stock footage originally produced by special-effects artists Willis O'Brien and Ray Harryhausen and used in the 1956 Warner Bros.  nature documentary The Animal World. Also, according to Turner Classic Movies, the "ratty ape-suit" used to create Trog's caveman appearance was a "leftover monkey outfit" from Stanley Kubrick's epic 1968 film 2001: A Space Odyssey.

Freddie Francis later referred to Trog as "a terrible film" and as one he regretted directing:

Joe Cornelius, who plays the feature's title character, provides a quite different perspective on Crawford's actions and demeanor during filming. As a professional wrestler in England, Cornelius performed in the ring for 20 years as "The Dazzler" and was chosen to portray Trog due to his physique and athletic abilities. His role provided him with numerous opportunities to observe Crawford both on and off camera. Forty-five years after the release of the film, in an interview arranged and video-recorded by the British Film Institute (BFI), he shared publicly for the first time his experiences working on the production and more specifically with the veteran actress. That interview occurred in September 2015, just prior to a screening of Trog by BFI in one of its film retrospectives. It was conducted by the American director and writer John Waters, a notable promoter and creator of underground or "transgressive cult films", as well as a fan of many other types of low-budget, more mainstream productions like Trog. In his interview with Waters, Cornelius takes exception to reports that Crawford used "idiot cards" and was periodically drunk during filming. The former wrestler says he saw no use of such cards by her; and he describes Crawford as "great" to work with, consistently on time and "lovely" on the set, as generous in giving gifts to the crew, and how for years after completing Trog she sent him a personal card every Christmas. While he concedes that Crawford "possibly" had vodka in her Pepsi-Cola container, he also states that he never saw her drunk or unable to perform for any reason during the film's production.

Reception
Recalling his work on the film in 1992, Cohen noted that the film was completed on time, came in under budget, and was in his opinion "very successful". Many 1970 reviews of the film, however, were not favorable. In September that year, after previewing Trog, critic Roger Ebert begins his assessment of the film with a question:

In October 1970, only a few days after the film's nationwide release in the United States, The New York Times'''s review at least offers two faintly positive observations about Crawford's involvement in the low-budget production:

In the decades since its premiere, Trog has achieved a near cult status among some movie fans, especially those who enjoy watching low-budget horror and sci-fi productions for their outlandish plots or for their sheer campiness, that a particular film is "'so bad it's good'".Lowder, J. Bryan (2013). "Camp vs. Campy: There's a big difference", Slate (New York, N.Y. and Washington, D.C.), April 1, 2013. Retrieved September 6, 2019. The British Film Institute in the promotion of its 2015 retrospective program on Trog provided attendees with an updated or more current take on the film's appeal:
Warner Bros., the film's distributor in 1970, also chose "mind-boggling" to describe Trog during the company's "31 Days of Horror" promotion to sell copies of it in October 2015. In part of that promotion leading up to Halloween, Warner Bros. assures "campy cult fans" they will "delight" in the film and that both the troglodyte's makeup and "Crawford's boldly colored pantsuits" are "hilariously bad".

The film is listed in Golden Raspberry Award founder John Wilson's 2005 book The Official Razzie Movie Guide as one of "The 100 Most Enjoyably Bad Movies Ever Made". In 2012, several years before his previously described BFI interview with Joe Cornelius, John Waters recognized Trog as one of his favorite films on the streaming service MUBI.

Releases
The film was released theatrically in both the United States and United Kingdom by Warner Bros. in 1970. For home viewing and film collectors, Warner Home Video began marketing VHS copies of Trog'' in 1995 and in DVD format in 2007.

References

External links
 
 
 
 
 
 Interview, Attack of the Monster Movie Makers: Herman Cohen, Crazed Trog Goes Berzerk!

1970 horror films
1970 films
1970s science fiction horror films
1970s monster movies
British science fiction horror films
British monster movies
Films directed by Freddie Francis
Films scored by John Scott (composer)
Films set in England
Films shot at Bray Studios
Films using stop-motion animation
Films about cavemen
1970s English-language films
1970s British films